Loga Ramin Torkian،(Born: September 23 ،1964) is a musician and the co-founder of the groups Axiom of Choice and Niyaz.  Both groups incorporate Persian and Middle Eastern themes into their music. Torkian composes music and plays several instruments, including the Iranian tar, the Turkish saz, and the GuitarViol, an electric guitar-like instrument that uses a bow and is adapted from a 14th-century instrument. Several of the lyrics in his songs draw on or include traditional Middle-Eastern prayers, songs or chants. His music has also appeared in several films, such as The Chosen One (1995), America So Beautiful (2001), Plastic Flowers Never Die (2008), and Crossing Over (2009).

Personal life

He is  married to singer Azam Ali and they have one son. He previously was married to 
Yatrikadevi Shah-Rais and was co-owner of the retail store Koan Collection in Los Angeles (which has since closed).

Discography
Solo
’’Brink of Absolute’’ (2020)
Mehraab (2011)
"Lamentation of Swans" by Azam Ali and Loga R. Torkian (2013)
Axiom of Choice
Beyond Denial (1995)
Niya Yesh (2000)
Unfolding (2002)
Niyaz
 Niyaz (2005)
 Niyaz Remixed (2006)
 Nine Heavens (2008)
 Sumud (2012)
 The Fourth Light (2015)

Filmography
The Chosen One (1995)
America So Beautiful (2001)
Plastic Flowers Never Die (2008)
Crossing Over (2009)

References

External links
 Biography
 Discography
 
 Official website

Living people
Iranian composers
Iranian tar players
1964 births
Six Degrees Records artists